The Top of the World Tour was the 2003 concert tour by American country music trio Dixie Chicks. It was in support of their album Home, and named after the song "Top of the World" on that album.

History
The tour began with three promotional concerts in Europe and Australia.  During the first of these on March 10, 2003, at Shepherd's Bush Empire in London, Natalie Maines made her controversial remarks criticizing President George W. Bush a few days before the start of the Iraq War: "Just so you know, we’re on the good side with y’all. We do not want this war, this violence, and we’re ashamed that the President of the United States is from Texas."  The backdrop to this statement was the large protests in Britain against the impending war.

The first leg of the tour then took place in North America, running from the beginning of May to mid-August. The Bush controversy and a comment against a Toby Keith song resulted in the state of South Carolina not wanting to let the band in. Natalie Maines stated, "These fans paid their hard earned money to see us play, and we will give them the show they paid to see!" The concert went on. The second leg took place in Western Europe in September, followed by a brief third leg in Australia that finished in early October. A couple of concerts back in the United States finished the tour.

The tour grossed $60.5 million, making it the highest grossing country music tour up until that time (since superseded by several artists). It was also the 8th highest-grossing tour of any genre in 2003.

The live album Top of the World Tour: Live and DVD Top of the World Tour: Live document the tour — both are composed of performances from multiple shows.  Dressing room and on-stage scenes from the tour, as well as the effect of Maines' controversial statement on the venture, were included in the 2006 documentary Dixie Chicks: Shut Up and Sing.

The show

The multi-tiered in-the-round stage was a feat of engineering complete with shifting hydraulic-lift levels, winding catwalks and walkways that extended over the heads of the audience. It weighed over 80,000 pounds and took up most of the arena floor. A crew of 120 traveled in thirteen busses and seventeen trucks. This show included the largest touring video show, with 1.5 million LED lights displaying graphics on video screens and on the floor of the stage. During the show, artificial flowers, grass, trees and a windmill sprung up from underneath the stage. It took over 2000 amps of power and 240 pounds of  gas to run the special effects for each show.

Recorded pre-show music included "(What's So Funny 'Bout) Peace, Love and Understanding?", "Band on the Run", "Thank You (Falettinme Be Mice Elf Agin)", and "Born in the U.S.A.".

During the show the three singers used headset microphones and were frequently well apart from each other.  Nevertheless, stage patter was fairly frequent, with a notable case of Martie Maguire  confessing that her rather unusual clothing assemblage made her look like "Crack whore Barbie". A new addition to the group's repertoire was a long, churning rendition of Bob Dylan's travelphobic "Mississippi".

In the opening U.S. show, Natalie offered fans 15 seconds to boo, in reference of the controversy surrounding the tour. However, after a count of three, there was thunderous applause instead.

Opening acts
Joan Osborne (North America, Spring 2003) Start-Philadelphia
Michelle Branch (North America, Summer 2003)
Jann Arden  (Canada, August 2003)
The Thorns  (Europe, Australia)

Set list

The following songs were performed during the concert at Madison Square Garden in New York City. It does not represent all songs performed on tour.
"Goodbye Earl"
"Some Days You Gotta Dance"
"There's Your Trouble"
"Long Time Gone"
"Tortured, Tangled Hearts"
"Travelin' Soldier
"Am I The Only One (Who's Ever Felt This Way)"
"Hello Mr. Heartache"
"Cold Day in July"
"White Trash Wedding"
"Lil' Jack Slade"
"A Home"
"Truth No. 2"
"If I Fall You're Going Down with Me"
"Mississippi"
"Cowboy Take Me Away"
"Godspeed (Sweet Dreams)"
"Landslide"
"Ready To Run"
"Wide Open Spaces"
Encore 		
"Top of the World"
"Sin Wagon"

Tour dates

Festivals and other miscellaneous performances
Recording Artists Coalition Benefit

Cancellations and rescheduled shows

Backing band
There may have been minor changes to this lineup depending on the venue.
Roscoe Beck – bass
John Deaderick – keyboards
John Gardner – drums
David Grissom – acoustic guitar, electric guitar
John Mock – pennywhistle, concertina, percussion, guitar and more.
Brent Truitt – mandolin
Robbie Turner – steel guitar
Keith Sewell – acoustic guitar

External links
[www.dixiechicks.com Dixie Chicks Official Website]
Tour Info

References

The Chicks concert tours
2003 concert tours